North Buton Regency (Kabupaten Buton Utara) is a regency of Indonesia's Southeast Sulawesi Province, which was separated from Buton Regency in accordance with Indonesia's Law Number 14 of 2007. The area of the regency, which covers the north part of Buton Island, is 1,923.03 km2. Its population was 54,736 at the 2010 Census and 66,653 at the 2020 Census; the official estimate as at mid 2021 was 67,714. The principal town lies at Buranga.

Administration 
North Buton Regency is divided into six districts (kecamatan), tabulated below with their areas and their populations at the 2010 Census and the 2020 Census, together with the official estimates as at mid 2021. The table also includes the locations of the district administrative centres, the number of administrative villages (rural desa and urban kelurahan) in each district, and its post code.

Notes: (a) includes 4 small offshore islands. (a) includes 3 small offshore islands. Five other administrative districts (kecamatan) which lie geographically on the west coast of North Buton - Pasir Putih, Pasi Kolaga, Wakorumba Selatan (South Wakorumba), Batukara and Maligano - with a combined area of 400.78 km2 and a population of 22,534 at the 2020 Census), are administratively part of Muna Regency.

Climate
Buranga, the regency seat has a tropical savanna climate (Aw) with moderate to little rainfall from July to November and heavy rainfall from December to June.

References

Regencies of Southeast Sulawesi